It Works for Me is a studio album by American country artist Barbara Mandrell. It was originally released on April 21, 1994 via Direct Records. The original version of the album was only sold on television through a marketing campaign. In 1997, it was re-released via Razor & Tie and was sold to retailers in multiple formats. Both releases contained the same track listing of 12 songs. The album contained a mixture of covers as well as original material. It was Mandrell's twenty seventh studio project and the final studio project released in her career.

Background and recording
In the late 1970s and early 1980s, Barbara Mandrell was considered among country music's most successful artists. During this period she had a series of top ten and number one singles on the North American country charts. By the end of the 1980s, Mandrell's singles began to reach progressively lower chart positions, although she remained on a major label until the early 1990s. In 1994, it was announced that Direct Records (a New York based record company) would release two studio albums of Mandrell's music directly through television marketing. They were not sold in retail stores despite a willingness from specialty companies. The two albums would be Acoustic Attitude and It Works for Me. The disc was recorded at the Groundstar Lab, a studio located in Nashville, Tennessee. The sessions were co-produced by Brent Rowan and Mandrell. It was her second studio album to include Mandrell on production credits.

Content and release
It Works for Me was a collection of 12 recordings new to Mandrell's catalog. It included several covers, including Brenda Russell's "Get Here" and Van Morrison's "Have I Told You Lately". It also featured the original tracks "I Won't Be Home Tonight" and "Love by Any Name". Also included was the track "Ten Pound Hammer", which was first recorded by Aaron Tippin for his 1995 album Tool Box. The album was first released on April 21, 1994 on Direct Records. It was originally distributed as a compact disc. The disc's release marked the twenty seventh studio album of Mandrell's music career. It was sold exclusively on television in combination with what was described by Billboard as a "fan pack". Items included in the package were a biography and an autographed photo. It was mostly marketed on The Nashville Network. 

In March 1997, it was announced that Mandrell had signed a recording contract with the Razor & Tie label. One month later, the label re-released It Works for Me with the same track listing, however the photography was different. It was made available as both a compact disc and as a cassette. Years later, the album was reissued to digital platforms including Spotify. It Works for Me marked the final album in Mandrell's recording career. She would retire from the entertainment industry shortly after the disc's 1997 re-release.

Track listing

Compact disc and digital versions

Cassette version

Personnel
All credits are adapted from the liner notes of It Works for Me and AllMusic.

Musical personnel
 Michael Black – Background vocals
 Gary Burr – Background vocals
 Bruce Dees – Background vocals
 Owen Hale – Drums
 Jim Horn – Saxophone
 Barbara Mandrell – Lead vocals
 Steve Nathan – Keyboards
 Michael Rhodes – Bass
 John Wesley Ryles – Background vocals
 Brent Rowan – Guitar
 Dennis Wilson – Background vocals

Technical personnel
 Paul Aresu – Photography
 Derek Bason – Assistant engineer
 Eric Darken – Percussion
 John Guess – Mixing engineer
 John Hurley – Assistant engineer
 Ioannis – Art direction, design
 Stephen Jacaruso – Design
 Barbara Mandrell – Producer
 Keith Odle – Engineer
 Brent Rowan – Producer
 Denny Somach – Project coordinator
 Liz Vap – Art direction, design
 Marty Williams – Assistant engineer, mixing engineer

Release history

References

1994 albums
1997 albums
Barbara Mandrell albums
Razor & Tie albums
Albums produced by Brent Rowan